The Chicago and North Western Railway's Class E-4 comprised nine coal-burning streamlined 4-6-4 "Hudson" steam locomotives built in 1937 by Alco.

They were built to haul the road's famous "400" express passenger trains, but before they were even delivered the railroad's management decided that streamlined steam was the wrong direction and instead placed orders with General Motors Electro-Motive Division for new diesel locomotives. The displaced E-4s instead worked other trains until they were withdrawn from service between 1953 and 1961. All were scrapped, with none surviving to be preserved.
The nine E-4s were almost identical in specification and purpose to the Milwaukee Road's six class F7 locomotives, and they were built by the same builder at the same time, yet they were different in almost every detail of design.

Other CNW steam locomotives 
 Chicago and North Western class D 4-4-2 – A major workhorse of the C&NW, some were used on the Minnesota 400.
 Chicago and North Western class E 4-6-2 – Some converted to "ES" class with similar shrouding to the E-4. The ES engines succeeded Class D locomotives on the Minnesota 400.
 Chicago and North Western class E-2 4-6-2 – Twelve locomotives, four of which were converted to "E-2-a" class and were the original locomotives for the Twin Cities to Chicago 400 before being replaced by EMD E3 diesel units. The remaining eight were converted to "E-2-b" locomotives.

References 

 The Photos of the Chicago and Northwestern E-4 4-6-4's
 http://steamlocomotive.com/locobase.php?country=USA&wheel=4-6-4&railroad=cnw

4-6-4 locomotives
E-4 class
ALCO locomotives
Steam locomotives of the United States
Streamlined steam locomotives
Railway locomotives introduced in 1937
Scrapped locomotives
Standard gauge locomotives of the United States
Passenger locomotives